Aliabad (also Romanized as ‘Alīābād) is a village in Hanza Rural District, Hanza District, Rabor County, Kerman Province, Iran.

References 

Populated places in Rabor County